Dildoides: A Burlesque Poem is a 1706 work by Samuel Butler about a collection of dildos that was seized and destroyed by the authorities.

References 

1706 books